The following article presents a summary of the 2008 association football season in Paraguay. One of the most noticeable changes in the 2008 season is that the first division tournament will not longer have a single champion for the year; instead there will be two champions in the season, one being the winner of the Apertura tournament and the other being the winner of the Clausura tournament.

First division results
The first division tournament was divided in two sections: the Apertura and the Clausura and had 12 teams participating in a two round all-play-all system. The team with the most points at the end of the two rounds was crowned as the champion.

Torneo Apertura

Torneo Clausura

Aggregate table

Qualification to international competitions
Libertad qualified to the 2009 Copa Libertadores (by winning the Torneo Apertura and Clausura) and the 2009 Copa Sudamericana.
Club Guaraní qualified to the 2009 Copa Libertadores as the second best finisher in the aggregate points table.
Nacional qualified to the 2009 Copa Libertadores as the third best finisher in the aggregate points table.
Cerro Porteño qualified to the 2009 Copa Sudamericana as the fourth best finisher in the aggregate points table.

Relegation
The team with the worst average points over the last three years is automatically relegated to the second division league, and the second-worst team plays a playoff match against the second division runner-up. 
The winner of the playoff match plays in the first division the following year.

Last Updated: December 24, 2008. * League Stats

Promotion game
The promotion was played between 3 de Febrero and the second division runner-up General Caballero ZC. The first game ended with a 3-0 score favorable to 3 de Febrero, while the second finished 2-1 in favor of General Caballero. Since the aggregate score was 4-2 for 3 de Febrero, they remain in the first division.

Paraguayan teams in international competitions

Paraguay national team
The following table lists all the games played by the Paraguay national football team in official competitions during 2008.

KEY:  F = Friendly match; WCQ2010 = 2010 FIFA World Cup qualification

References

External links
 Paraguay 2008 by Eli Schmerler and Juan Pablo Andrés at RSSSF
 Diario ABC Color

 
Seasons in Paraguayan football